TNF receptor-associated factor 1 is a protein that in humans is encoded by the TRAF1 gene.

Function 

The protein encoded by this gene is a member of the TNF receptor (TNFR) associated factor (TRAF) protein family. TRAF proteins associate with, and mediate the signal transduction from various receptors of the TNFR superfamily. This protein and TRAF2 form a heterodimeric complex, which is required for TNF-alpha-mediated activation of MAPK8/JNK and NF-kappaB. The protein complex formed by this protein and TRAF2 also interacts with IAP, and thus mediates the anti-apoptotic signals from TNF receptors. The expression of this protein can be induced by Epstein-Barr virus (EBV). EBV infection membrane protein 1 (LMP1) is found to interact with this and other TRAF proteins; this interaction is thought to link LMP1-mediated B lymphocyte transformation to the signal transduction from TNFR family receptors. TRAF1 also functions as a negative regulator of inflammation by interfering with the linear ubiquitination of NEMO downstream of TLR signaling. This explains why TRAF1 polymorphisms cause an increased risk for rheumatic diseases.

Interactions 

TRAF1 has been shown to interact with:

 BIRC2, 
 Baculoviral IAP repeat-containing protein 3, 
 CFLAR, 
 Caspase 8, 
 HIVEP3, 
 RANK 
 TNFAIP3, 
 TRAF interacting protein, and
 TRAF2. 
 RNF31.
 RBCK1.
 SHARPIN.

References

Further reading